Ngkoth (Nggɔt, Nggoth, Ŋkot) is an extinct Paman language formerly spoken on the Cape York Peninsula of Queensland, Australia, by the Winduwinda. It is unknown when it became extinct.

Phonology

Vowels
Ngkoth has seven vowels:

Consonants
Ngkoth has 17 consonants found in native words, and three consonants found only in loanwords:

 is a trilled affricate.

 are only found in loanwords.

References 

Northern Paman languages
Extinct languages of Queensland